Paul Watkins (born January 1, 1964) is an American author who currently lives with his wife, Cathy, and two children, Emma and Oliver, in Hightstown, New Jersey. He is a teacher and writer-in-residence at The Peddie School, and formerly taught at Lawrenceville School. He attended the Dragon School, Oxford, Eton and Yale University. He received a B.A. from Yale and was a University Fellow at Syracuse University. His recollections of his time at the Dragon School and Eton form his autobiographical work Stand Before Your God: An American Schoolboy in England (1993). He wrote his first book, Night Over Day Over Night (1988), when he was 16 years old.

Fiction
 Night Over Day Over Night (1988)
 Calm at Sunset, Calm at Dawn (1989) (won 1990 Encore Award)
 In the Blue Light of African Dreams (1990)
 The Promise of Light (1992)
 Archangel (1995)
 The Story of my Disappearance (1997)
 The Forger (2000)
 Thunder God (2004)
 The Ice Soldier (2005)

Non-fiction
 Stand Before Your God: An American Schoolboy in England (1993)
 The Fellowship of Ghosts: Travels in the Land of Midnight Sun (2006)

Recent works
Recently Watkins has begun writing a series of novels under the pseudonym Sam Eastland. His new detective series is set in Stalinist Russia with Inspector Pekkala as protagonist.
 Eye of the Red Tsar (2010)
 The Red Coffin (UK title) / Shadow Pass (US title) (2011)
 Siberian Red (UK title) / Archive 17 (US title) (2012)
 The Red Moth (2013)
 The Beast in the Red Forest (2014)
 Red Icon (2015)
 Berlin Red (2016)

References

External links
 Paul Watkins website
 Paul Watkins on www.fantasticfiction.co.uk

People educated at The Dragon School
People educated at Eton College
1964 births
Living people
Yale University alumni
Syracuse University faculty
People from Hightstown, New Jersey
American male novelists
Novelists from New Jersey
20th-century American novelists
21st-century American novelists
American mystery novelists
20th-century American male writers
21st-century American male writers
Novelists from New York (state)